The Seat of the Coptic Orthodox Pope of Alexandria is historically based in Alexandria, Egypt. It is commonly known as the Holy See of Saint Mark, to whom the Coptic Pope claims to be the legitimate successor.

Ruling powers moved away from Alexandria to Cairo after the Muslim conquest of Egypt. During Pope Christodolos's tenure, the official residence of the Coptic Pope moved to the Hanging Church in Cairo.

Current seats
Saint Mark's Coptic Orthodox Cathedral (Cairo) 1968–present
Saint Mark's Coptic Orthodox Cathedral (Alexandria)  AD 60–present

The current Seat of the Coptic Orthodox Pope of Alexandria is in both Alexandria and Cairo, in the compound holding the Patriarchal palace, Saint Mark's Coptic Orthodox Cathedral (known as St. Mark's Cathedral) and other Patriarchal Institutions in both Alexandria and Cairo. 

There is also a major Patriarchal compound within the outer walls of the Monastery of Saint Pishoy in the Scetes of the Nitrian Desert of Egypt (Wadi El Natrun). It is used when the Pope is in a spiritual retreat or when hosting major ecclesiastical conventions within the Oriental Orthodox Church communion or with the Eastern Orthodox Church or the Roman Catholic Church and its Uniate Churches.

Previous seats
The Hanging Church in Coptic Cairo 1047–c.1300
Saint Mercurius Church (Coptic Cairo) 1300–c.1400
Saint Mary Church (Harat Zewila) 1400–1600
Saint Mary Church (Haret Elroum) 1660–1800
Saint Mark's Coptic Orthodox Cathedral (Azbakeya) 1800–1968

See also
Coptic Orthodox Church
Coptic Cairo

References

Seat